Hyde Park Gardens, also known as Hyde Park Terrace consists of two roads running adjacent to the north western corner of Hyde Park, Westminster, Greater London. Number 1 Hyde Park Gardens runs up to Number 23 with a large private communal garden and then the road separates to allow access to The Ring and into Hyde Park and the neighbouring Kensington Gardens. This section contains the High Commission of Sri Lanka. Numbers 24 to 31 continue on a private gated road also with their own communal gardens buffering them from the busy Bayswater Road. They are amongst the most exclusive properties on the northern side of Hyde Park and date from the early 19th century. Grand white stucco fronted houses now converted into equally grand flats. Access is strictly controlled via 24-hour porterage.

Hyde Park Gardens is listed Grade II in two groups on the National Heritage List for England, as 1–24, and 25–38 are jointly listed with 22-35 Stanhope Terrace.

An early resident of 18 Hyde Park Gardens was Maria Drummond, widow of Thomas Drummond and the adopted daughter of Richard "Conversation" Sharp. Here is a description of a party that took place there on 18 March 1844:

The library, designed by the architect Decimus Burton, was said to be the most beautiful feature of this particular house, where Macaulay and Archbishop Whately were also welcome visitors, and a further description of the downstairs accommodation has also survived, as follows:

Hyde Park Gardens Mews lies behind the houses and originally served as stables for Hyde Park Gardens.

Notable residents
 Yvonne Hackenbroch (1912–2012), museum curator and historian of jewellery, died at no. 31, four months after celebrating her 100th birthday.
The photographer Antony Beauchamp, son-in-law of Winston Churchill, killed himself on 18 August 1957 by taking a barbiturate overdose at his flat in Hyde Park Gardens.

 William Henry Wills, 1st Baron Winterstoke ( 1830 - 1911 ) who was a member of the Wills tobacco family dynasty, and the 1st chairman of Imperial Tobacco. His London residence was at 25 Hyde Park Gardens.

References

External links

 The Hyde Park Estate

Streets in the City of Westminster
World War II prisoner of war camps in England
Bayswater
Grade II listed houses in London
Grade II listed buildings in the City of Westminster
Hyde Park, London
Communal gardens